Technology-enhanced active learning, or TEAL, is a new method of teaching pioneered at MIT as an alternative to the traditional style of lecture halls. It is currently in use at the Rensselaer Polytechnic Institute, North Carolina State University, University of Colorado, Harvard University, and the University of Maryland.

See also
Active learning
CDIO Initiative
SCALE-UP

References

Teaching
Massachusetts Institute of Technology